Manendragarh, is a city and administrative district headquarters of Manendragarh-Chirmiri-Bharatpur district in the state of Chhattisgarh, India. Formerly, it was the part of Koriya district. It is situated near the Chhattisgarh-Madhya Pradesh state border. The Chief Minister of Chhattisgarh state, Shri Bhupesh Baghel, inaugurated Manendragarh District on 9 September 2022 by separating it from korea district.

Manendragarh Railway Station is on the Anuppur-Chirmiri rail route. The area is surrounded by many coal mines including Rajnagar, Ramnagar, Haldibadi, Khongapani, Ledri, Nai Ledri, Jhagrakhand. Manendragarh was originated by some tribals around 100 years ago; later developed by British Raj for coal excavation in Jhagrakhand, Rajnagar and Khongapani Colliery. Road and Railway Lines are developed by a British Engineer B.B. Lahidi.

National Highway 43 has its route through Manendragarh. Sirrouli temple is located in Manendragarh near Udalkachar railway station. Amrit Dhara Waterfall is a nearby attraction. "Sidh-Baba" mount is known for the Shiva temple. Shiv Dhara waterfall is also a picnic spot situated amongst deep forest. Manendragarh also have many Government schools, private schools in which primary and Higher education are given. There are many hospitals and Nursing Home around the city some of them are Central hospital Manendragarh, Community Health Centre (CHC), Khan Memorial, Primary Health Centre etc. There are Parks, Restaurants and many Temple, mosque, church, Gurudwara in the big city.

Demographics
As of the 2011 India census, Manendragarh had a population of 30,748. Males constitute 53% of the population and females 47%. Manendragarh has an average literacy rate of 72%, higher than the national average of 59.5%: male literacy is 79%, and female literacy is 64%. In Manendragarh, 13% of the population is under 6 years of age.

Geology

National geological monument

Marine Gondwana Fossil Park, also called Lower Permian Marine bed at Manendragarh  lies nearby and it has been declared the National Geological Monuments of India by the Geological Survey of India (GSI), for their protection, maintenance, promotion and enhancement of geotourism.

Minerals 
Region of Manendragarh has vast reserves of high-grade coal. The main coal belts are in the Hasdo basin. There are small deposits of limestone, fire clay and red oxide in Manendragarh.

Ecology

Drainage 
A part of Manendragarh region lies in the Ganges basin and the remaining portion is in the Mahanadi basin. Gopad is the major tribute of Son and originates about 10 miles North of Mendra village. It drains the Northern portion of the District. Hasdeo a major tributary of Mahanadi has its origin in Mendra village.

Rivers 
The Hasdeo river is the largest river flowing towards the South. It rises from 23°30´ North by 82°30´ East on the Sonhat Plateau and drains the South-Western part of the District. In this District, the river course resembles an upturned 'S' and flows for about 95 km. After a course of about 72 km, it enters Bilaspur District at 23° North. It receives the waters of the Gej and the Chornai on the left bank and the Tan and the Ahiran on the right before it meets the Mahanadi. The total length of the river is 245 km. The valley is narrow. Important settlements along the river are Sonhat, Ghugra, Manendragarh, Kosgain, Korba and Champa.

Forest 
Manendragarh has vast range of forests. Up to the last decade of the 19th century. Most common trees of Korea District are Sal, Mahua, Tendu, Palas, Char, Bija, Harra, Bahera, Sisam, Kusum, Salya, Khair, Arun, Gamhar etc. Bamboos are mostly available in the forests.

Economy 
The income of Manendragarh Region is based on rural market as well as South Eastern Coal Limited (SECL). Chamber of Commerce is established in Manendragarh for the issues regarding businesses and for the welfare of business owners. Manendragarh is surrounded by 4 out of 11 SECL area namely Hasdeo Area, chrimiri Area, Baikunthpur & jamuna Kotma. There are many banks and financial services some of them are CENTRAL BANK OF INDIA, HDFC bank, IDFC First Bank Limited, Axis Bank, SBI, Canara Bank, Mahindra finance, Bajaj finance, Shriram finance, cholamandalam etc.

Education 
 Bachpan - A play school
 Bachpan- Academic heights public school
 Blossom's Academy
 Cambridge Montessori School Manendragarh (कैम्ब्रिज मॉन्टेसरी स्कूल मनेन्द्रगढ़)
 Gurukul Vidya Mandir (Mouharpara)
 Kendriya Vidyalaya Railway, Manendragarh
 Kendriya Vidyalaya SECL, North Jhagrakhand
 Saint Joseph's Mission School (Branch of Bijuri)
 Saint Joseph's Convent School (JKD)
 Saint Patrick Academy
 Saraswati Shishu Mandir, Manendragarh
 Saraswati Shishu Mandir, Jhagrakhand
 Saraswati Vikas Vidyalaya
 Saraswati Kanya Maha Vidyalaya
 Shardesh Higher Secondary School
 The Gurukul International School
 Universal Public School, Manendragarh
 Vijay English Medium school

Transport

By road
National High way 43 connects Manendragarh with other parts of the state. Bus services operate between the different cities of Madhya Pradesh (like Rewa, Jabalpur), Chhattisgrah (Bilaspur, Raipur), Uttar Pradesh (Allahabad, Varanasi), Jharkhand(Ranchi) and Bihar.

By air 
Nearest airport is Raipur
Another nearby airport is Jabalpur

By Train 
Various trains are available for connectivity to other cities like Bilaspur, Raipur, Durg, Ambikapur Jabalpur, Rewa, Katni etc.

Manendragarh Railway station has direct connectivity with many cities of Madhya Pradesh and Chhattishgarh.

Manendragarh station is situated on the Anuppur - Chirmiri railway line.

References

 manendragarh mandi

Cities and towns in Koriya district